Breakfast at Pappa's is an EP by the English punk rock band, Consumed. It was released in July 1998 on the American independent punk label, Fat Wreck Chords. The song "Heavy Metal Winner" was used in the video game Tony Hawk's Pro Skater 2 and the video game Totaled!.

Track listing 
All tracks written by Consumed
"Heavy Metal Winner" – 2:29
"Bye-Bye, Fatman" – 2:48   
"Brutal Tooth" – 1:33   
"Stand Under Me" – 3:18  
"Nonsense Cone" – 2:22   
"Bigger Shoe" – 2:34

Credits 
 Steve Ford – guitar, vocals
 Mike Ford – guitar, vocals
 Baz Barrett – bass guitar
 Chris Billam – drums
 Produced and engineered by Andy Sneap

External links 
 Fat Wreck Chords release page

Consumed (band) EPs
1998 EPs
Albums produced by Andy Sneap
Fat Wreck Chords EPs